Michelle Tesoro is an American film editor. She is best known for her work on the television miniseries The Queen's Gambit (2020), which earned her an ACE Eddie Award and a Primetime Emmy Award.

Life 
Michelle Tesoro grew up in Chicago. She attended Whitney M. Young High School, studied at the University of Illinois at Urbana-Champaign and graduated at the Tisch School of the Arts.

She started her career as DVD and promo editor at ABKCO Music & Records in New York City. In 2005 she moved to Los Angeles. Soon she became assistant editor for film and TV productions. Since 2007 she started to edit TV productions like The Mimi & Flo Show, Swingtown and In Treatment.

Her work for the dramedy Natural Selection was awarded the prize for best editing at the South by Southwest 2011.

Selected filmography 
 2007: The Mimi & Flo Show (TV series, 3 episodes)
 2008: Swingtown (TV series, 2 episodes)
 2009–2010: In Treatment (TV series, 17 episodes)
 2009: Women in Trouble
 2010: Fringe (TV series, 3 episodes)
 2011: Natural Selection
 2012: Luck (TV series, 4 episodes)
 2013: House of Cards (TV series, 5 episodes)
 2013: The Newsroom (TV series, 2 episodes)
 2014: ''''Revenge of the Green Dragons
 2014: Hoke (TV movie)
 2015: Flesh and Bone (Miniserie, 3 episodes)
 2017: When We Rise (Miniserie, 1 episodes)
 2017: Shot Caller
 2017: Godless (mini series, 7 episodes)
 2018: On the Basis of Sex
 2019: When They See Us (mini series, 1 episode)
 2019: Ballers (TV series, 1 episode)
 2020: The Queen's Gambit (mini series, 7 episodes)

Awards and nominations

References

External links
 
 

Living people
American film editors
American women film editors
People from Chicago
Primetime Emmy Award winners
Year of birth missing (living people)
21st-century American women